Nagpur Municipal Corporation is the municipal body administering Nagpur, in Maharashtra state in Central India.

History
Nagpur Municipal Council was established in 1864. At that time, Nagpur Municipal Council's geographical area was 15.5 km2  and Nagpur City's population was around 82,000 .

The duties of the Nagpur Municipal Council include maintaining cleanliness, supplying street lights, and water supply with government assistance. In 1922, the Central Provinces & Berar Municipalities Act was framed for the proper functioning of the Municipal Council.

On 22 January 1950, CP & Berar Act No. 2, was published in the Madhya Pradesh Gazette which is known as the City of Nagpur Corporation Act, 1948 (CNC Act). The Municipal Corporation came into existence in March 1951. The first development plan of the city was prepared in 1953. 
The Berar Province became part of the Maharashtra State in 1956 with Mumbai becoming the capital. Nagpur was declared the second capital of Maharashtra in 1960.

Administration
The corporation is headed by a Municipal commissioner, an IAS officer. He wields the executive power of the house. A quinquennial election is held to elect corporators to power. They are responsible for overseeing that their constituencies have the basic civic infrastructure in place and that there is no lacuna on the part of the authorities. The mayor is selected from the party with the largest vote. A largely ceremonial post, he has limited duties.

Various departments such as public relations, library, health, finance, buildings, slums, roads, street lighting, traffic, establishment, gardens, public works, local audit, legal services, waterworks, education, octroi, and fire services manage their specific activities. The activities of NMC are administered by its zonal offices.

NMC divides the city into 10 zones and which are served by zonal offices  
 Laxmi Nagar
 Dharampeth
 Hanuman Nagar
 Dhantoli
 Nehru Nagar
 Gandhi Baugh
 Sataranjipura
 Lakkadganj
 Ashi Nagar
 Mangalwari.
Seminary Hills 
 
As per NMC’s records, it has 10,450 employees at present (against a requirement of 12596) across more than 20 departments.

Each zone is divided into several wards. Each ward is represented by a corporation. NMC comprises 151 corporators, the majority of whom are elected in local elections. NMC and NIT together are in charge of the civic and infrastructure needs along with the development of new areas.

One of the mayors of Nagpur city, Devendra Fadnavis, went on to become Chief Minister of Maharashtra in 2014.

Responsibilities
As per the CNC Act, 1948, the key responsibility for providing basic urban services to Nagpur’s citizens lies with the Nagpur Municipal Corporation. The NMC is responsible for administering and providing basic infrastructure to the city:
 Building and Maintenance of roads, streets and flyovers.
 Public Municipal schools.
 Water purification and supply.
 Hospitals.
 Street lighting.
 Maintenance of parks and open spaces.
 Sewage treatment and disposal.
 Garbage disposal and street cleanliness.
 Urban development and city planning of new areas.
 Registering of births and deaths.

The NMC co-ordinates with various other government organizations like NIT, MHADA, MSRTC, the Traffic Police, MPCB, etc. for delivering these basic urban services.

Finances 
In 2004-05, NMC’s revenues registered a compounded annual growth rate (CAGR) of 6.9 percent and revenue expenditure increased at a CAGR of 9.0%. In spite of this, due to a strong revenue base in form of taxes, there was a revenue surplus of INR 78 crores and an overall surplus of INR 18.98 crores (including capital account). Revenue income is primarily earned by NMC or for NMC by some external sources. Among own sources, the largest source is octroi (47%) followed by property tax (18%).

In 2004-05, a capital expenditure of INR 79 crores was incurred, mainly covering water supply, public works, and roads. The cost recovery of services varies across sectors. For example, water expenditure exceeds revenue income each year, making it financially unsustainable. However, sewerage charges exceed the operation and maintenance expense but the current sewer coverage of the system is quite low.

Revenue sources 

The following are the Income sources for the Corporation from the Central and State Government.

Revenue from taxes  
Following is the Tax related revenue for the corporation.

 Property tax.
 Profession tax.
 Entertainment tax.
 Grants from Central and State Government like Goods and Services Tax.
 Advertisement tax.

Revenue from non-tax sources 

Following is the Non Tax related revenue for the corporation.

 Water usage charges.
 Fees from Documentation services.
 Rent received from municipal property.
 Funds from municipal bonds.

Election results

2017 results 
The results of the 2012 and 2017 elections are shown.

2012 results

List of Mayor

References

External links
 Official website of NMC

Government of Nagpur
Municipal corporations in Maharashtra
1951 establishments in Bombay State